Capcom's Gold Medal Challenge '92, known in Japan as  is a 1992 video game by Capcom. It was an Olympic sports game loosely based on the 1992 Summer Olympics in Barcelona. It heavily relied on button mashing style games. This game is also notable for its capability to have 8 human competitors to compete in the Olympiad concurrently against each other (although only two at a time).

Gameplay

The player can choose any of the 12 countries which includes: 

 
 
 
 
 
 
 
 
 
 
 
 

The object of the game is to win the best scores in the following events.

Reception

Allgame editor Skyler Miller described the game as an "overlooked gem (that) is definitely worth seeking out" and that the game "does an excellent job of recreating the total experience of Olympic competition".

Notes

References

External links
 Capcom's Gold Medal Challenge '92 at GameFAQs

1992 Summer Olympics
1992 video games
Capcom games
Nintendo Entertainment System games
Nintendo Entertainment System-only games
Summer Olympic video games
Video games set in 1992
Video games set in Spain
Barcelona in fiction
Multiplayer and single-player video games
Athletics video games
Video games developed in Japan